László Répási (born 23 March 1966) is a retired Hungarian football forward.

Club career
During his career, he won one Borsodi Liga with MTE Izzo Vác and he became top goalscorer in a league twice (with MTE Izzo Vác & Perak FA). He also won Malaysia Cup with Perak FA in 1998. His preferred playing position is as a striker, but he can also operate as a goal assistant.

International career
He made his debut for the Hungarian national team in 1993, and got 1 cap.

References

External links

1966 births
Living people
Footballers from Budapest
Hungarian footballers
Association football forwards
Hungary international footballers
Ferencvárosi TC footballers
Vác FC players
Csepel SC footballers
MTK Budapest FC players
Hungarian expatriate footballers
Expatriate footballers in Portugal
S.C. Espinho players
Hungarian expatriate sportspeople in Portugal
Paksi FC players
Expatriate footballers in Malaysia
Perak F.C. players
Hungarian expatriate sportspeople in Malaysia
Expatriate footballers in Finland
Tampere United players
Hungarian expatriate sportspeople in Finland
Hungarian football managers
Dunakanyar-Vác FC managers
Nemzeti Bajnokság I players
Veikkausliiga players